Dalila Zerrouki (born 1 February 1982) is an Algerian football retired player and current manager. She played as a forward and has been a member of the Algeria women's national team.

Early life
Zerrouki was born in Chlef.

Club career
Zerrouki has played for FC Blida and ASE Alger Centre in Algeria and for Lyon B and Claix in France.

International career
Zerrouki capped for Algeria at senior level during the 2006 African Women's Championship.

International goals
Scores and results list Algeria's goal tally first

International goals
Scores and results list United Arab Emirates goal tally first

References

External links

1982 births
Living people
People from Chlef
Algerian women's footballers
Women's association football forwards
Olympique Lyonnais Féminin players
Algeria women's international footballers
Algerian expatriate footballers
Algerian expatriate sportspeople in France
Expatriate women's footballers in France
Algerian football managers
Female association football managers
Algerian emigrants to the United Arab Emirates
Naturalized citizens of the United Arab Emirates
Emirati women's footballers
United Arab Emirates women's international footballers
Dual internationalists (women's football)
Emirati football managers
Al Ain FC managers
Emirati people of Algerian descent